Gary Armstrong (born 9 April 1952) is a British sprinter. He competed in the men's 400 metres at the 1972 Summer Olympics.

References

External links
 

1952 births
Living people
Athletes (track and field) at the 1972 Summer Olympics
British male sprinters
Olympic athletes of Great Britain
Place of birth missing (living people)